The women's 200 metres event at the 1985 Summer Universiade was held at the Kobe Universiade Memorial Stadium in Kobe on 31 August and 2 September 1985.

Medalists

Results

Heats
Held on 31 August

Wind:Heat 1: +2.6 m/s, Heat 3: -4.1 m/s

Semifinals
Held on 2 September

Wind:Heat 1: -2.9 m/s, Heat 2: +1.4 m/s

Final
Held on 2 September

Wind: -2.3 m/s

References

Athletics at the 1985 Summer Universiade
1985